The Magyar Kupa, is a national cup for professional women's volleyball in Hungary, organized by the Hungarian Volleyball Federation since the 1951 season. Between 1957–58 and 1961–62, the event was not held three consecutive seasons.

Most successful team of the Hungarian Women's Volleyball Cup are Kaposvár Volley with eighteen titles.

Winners
In 1954, 1955 and 1957, the cup was held on a grand scale. In 1983 they played two series (in March and December). In 1967 and 1968 the finals were played only in the following year.
Previous cup winners are:

 1951: Ganz Villamosság
 1952: Ganz Villamosság
 1953: MAFC
 1954: Not Played
 1955: Budapest SE
 1956: Budapest SE
 1957: Budapest SE
 1957–58: Budapest SE
 1958–61: Not Played
 1961–62: Újpest
 1962–63: Újpest
 1964: Újpest
 1965: Újpest
 1966: Újpest
 1967: Újpest
 1968: Újpest
 1969: NIM
 1970: NIM
 1971: NIM
 1972: NIM
 1973: NIM
 1974: Újpest
 1975: Újpest
 1976: NIM
 1977: NIM
 1978: NIM
 1979: Tungsram
 1980: Tungsram
 1981: Vasas
 1981–82: Tungsram
 1982–83: Vasas
 1983–84: Újpest
 1984–85: Tungsram
 1985–86: Újpest
 1986–87: Újpest
 1987–88: Tungsram
 1988–89: Tungsram
 1989–90: Vasas
 1990–91: Vasas
 1991–92: Tungsram
 1992–93: Tungsram
 1993–94: Eger
 1994–95: Eger
 1995–96: Eger
 1996–97: Eger
 1997–98: Eger
 1998–99: Tatabánya
 1999–00: Nyíregyháza
 2000–01: Nyíregyháza
 2001–02: Nyíregyháza
 2002–03: Nyíregyháza
 2003–04: Nyíregyháza
 2004–05: Vasas
 2005–06: Vasas
 2006–07: Nyíregyháza
 2007–08: Vasas
 2008–09: Vasas
 2009–10: Budapest SE
 2010–11: Budapest SE
 2011–12: Vasas
 2012–13: Vasas
 2013–14: Vasas
 2014–15: Vasas
 2015–16: Békéscsaba
 2016–17: Békéscsaba
 2017–18: Nyíregyháza
 2018–19:

References

External links
 Hungarian Volleyball Federaration 

Magyar Kupa Women
Cup